During the Spanish colonial period in the Philippines (1521–1898), the different cultures of the archipelago experienced a gradual unification from a variety of native Asian and Islamic customs and traditions, including animist religious practices, to what is known today as Filipino culture, a unique hybrid of Southeast Asian and Western culture, namely Spanish, including the Spanish language and the Catholic faith.

Spanish education played a major role in that transformation. The oldest universities, colleges, and vocational schools, dating as far back as the late 16th century were created during the colonial period, as well as the first modern public education system in Asia, established in 1863. By the time Spain was replaced by the United States as the colonial power, Filipinos were among the most educated peoples in all of Asia, boasting one of the highest literacy rates in that continent. Simultaneously, the knowledge of Filipinos about neighboring cultures receded.

The early period

During the early years of Spanish colonization, education was mostly run by the Church. Spanish friars and missionaries educated the natives and converted indigenous populations to the Catholic faith.

King Philip II's Leyes de Indias (Laws of the Indies) mandated Spanish authorities in the Philippines to educate the natives, to teach them how to read and write in the Spanish language. However, the latter objective was difficult given the realities of the time. The early friars learned the local languages to better communicate with the locals. In order to teach the Spanish language to the native population, the friars learned the local languages first, which also made possible the teaching of the Christian faith.

The Spanish missionaries established schools soon after reaching the islands and a few decades into the Spanish period, there was no Christian village without its school, with most children attending.

The Augustinians opened a school immediately upon arriving in Cebú in 1565. The Franciscans arrived in 1577, and they, too, immediately taught the people how to read and write, besides imparting to them important industrial and agricultural techniques. The Jesuits who arrived in 1581 also concentrated on teaching the young. When the Dominicans arrived in 1587, they did the same thing in their first mission in Bataan.

Within months of their arrival in Tigbauan which is in Iloilo province located in the island of Panay, Pedro Chirino and Francisco Martín had established a school for Visayan boys in 1593 in which they taught not only the catechism but reading, writing, Spanish, and liturgical music. The Spaniards of Arévalo heard of the school and wanted Chirino to teach their boys too. Chirino at once put up a dormitory and school house (1593–1594) for the Spanish boys near his rectory. It was the first Jesuit boarding school to be established in the Philippines.

The Chinese language version of the Doctrina Christiana (Christian Doctrine) was the first book printed in the Philippines in about 1590 to 1592. A version in Spanish, and in Tagalog, in both Latin script and the commonly used Baybayin script of the Manila Tagalogs of the time was printed in 1593. The goal to teach the Christian faith to the literate population. Eventually, the Baybayin script was replaced by the Latin script, as this became increasingly more useful and widespread.

In 1610,Tomas Pinpin a Filipino printer, writer and publisher, who is sometimes referred as the "Patriarch of Filipino Printing", wrote his famous Librong Pagaaralan nang manga Tagalog nang Uicang Castilla, that was meant to help Filipinos learn the Spanish language. The prologue read: 

There were also Latin schools where that language was taught together with some Spanish, since it was a mandatory requirement for the study of philosophy, theology and jurisprudence in schools like the University of Santo Tomás, run by the Dominicans. The Philippine priests and lawyers of that time, with the exception of the sons and daughters of Spaniards, Principalías and Ladinos, knew Latin perfectly well because the educational system was wholly religious.

The friars also opened many medical and pharmaceutical schools. The study of pharmacy consisted of a preparatory course with subjects in natural history and general chemistry and five years of studies in subjects such as pharmaceutical operations at the school of pharmacy. At the end of this period, the degree of Bachiller en Farmacia was granted.

By the end of the 16th century, several religious orders had established charity hospitals all over the archipelago and provided the bulk of this public service. These hospitals also became the setting for rudimentary scientific research work on pharmacy and medicine, focusing mostly on the problems of infectious diseases. Several Spanish missionaries catalogued hundreds of Philippine plants with medicinal properties. The Manual de Medicinas Caseras..., written by Father Fernando de Santa María, first published in 1763, became so sought after that it was reprinted on several editions by 1885.

Colegio de Santa Potenciana was the first school and college for girls that opened in the Philippines, in 1589. It was followed by another school for women, Colegio de Santa Isabel, that opened in 1632. Other Schools and Colleges for girls were Santa Catalina, Santa Rosa, La Concordia, etc. Several religious congregations also established schools for orphaned girls who could not educate themselves.

Tertiary schools

In 1590, the Universidad de San Ignacio was founded in Manila by the Jesuits, initially as the Colegio-Seminario de San Ignacio. By the second half of the 17th century, the university was incorporated as a mere College of Medicine and Pharmacy into the University of Santo Tomás.

The Colegio de San Ildefonso was established in 1595 in Cebú by the Society of Jesus. The school closed down in 1768, but the present-day University of San Carlos makes the claim of tracing its roots to the arguably defunct 16th century school. This claim has been the subject of numerous debates.

On April 28, 1611, the Universidad de Santo Tomás was founded in Manila, initially named as the Colegio de Nuestra Señora del Santísimo Rosario and later renamed as Colegio de Santo Tomas.  On November 20, 1645, Pope Innocent X elevated it to University. King Charles III of Spain bestowed the title "Royal" in 1785, and Pope Leo XIII "Pontifical" in 1902. Pope Pius XII designated it as La Real y Pontificia Universidad de Santo Tomás de Aquino Universidad Católica de Filipinas (The Catholic University of the Philippines), in 1947.

In 1640, the Universidad de San Felipe de Austria was established in Manila. It was the first public university created by the Spanish government in the Philippines. It closed down in 1643.

The Jesuits also founded the Colegio de San José (1601) and took over the management of a school that became the Escuela Municipal (1859, later renamed Ateneo Municipal de Manila in 1865, now the Ateneo de Manila University). The Dominicans on their part had the Colegio de San Juan de Letrán (1620) in Manila. All of them provided courses leading to different prestigious degrees, like the Bachiller en Artes, that by the 19th century included science subjects such as physics, chemistry, natural history and mathematics. The University of Santo Tomás, for example, started by teaching theology, philosophy and humanities. During the 18th century, the Faculty of Jurisprudence and Canonical Law was established.

In 1871, several schools of medicine and pharmacy were opened. From 1871 to 1883 Santo Tomás alone had 829 registrations of medical students, and from 1883 until 1898, 7965 medical students. By the end of the Spanish colonial rule in 1898. the university had granted the degree of Licenciado en Medicina to 359 graduates and 108 medical doctors. For the doctorate degree in medicine its provision was inspired in the same set of oppositions than those of universities in the metropolis, and at least an additional year of study was required at the Universidad Central de Madrid in Spain.

Dispute over the oldest in the Philippines

The title of the oldest in the Philippines has been topic for debate between two educational institutions: the University of Santo Tomas and the University of San Carlos.

The University of Santo Tomas, established in 1611 as the Colegio de Nuestra Señora de Santisimo Rosario, is generally recognized as the oldest university in the Philippines. In 1935 the Commonwealth government of the Philippines through the Historical Research and Markers Committee declared that UST was "oldest university under the American flag." In the 1990s, the Intramuros Administration installed a marker on the original site of the University of Santo Tomas with the recognition that the university is the "oldest university in Asia." In 2011 Pope Benedict XVI recognized UST as "the oldest institution of Catholic higher education in the Far East," while in 2012 the National Historical Commission of the Philippines published an online article recognizing UST as "Asia's Oldest University.

However, the University of San Carlos has opposed this recognition and claims that it is older than the University of Santo Tomas by 16 years by tracing its roots to the Colegio de San Ildefonso (established 1595). In 1995, the University of San Carlos celebrated its Quadricentennial (400th Anniversary).

Numerous scholars and official government bodies have reviewed the case. In 2010, the National Historical Commission of the Philippines installed a bronze marker declaring USC's foundation late in the 18th century, effectively disproving any direct connection with the Colegio de San Ildefonso. According to Dr. Victor Torres of the De La Salle University, the University of San Carlos' claim dates back to 1948 only when USC was declared a university. Fidel Villarroel from the University of Santo Tomas argued that USC only took over the facility of the former Colegio de San Ildefonso and that there is no 'visible' and 'clear' link between San Carlos and San Ildefonso. Aloysius Cartagenas (a Cebuano), in a paper published by Philippiniana Sacra, stated that the correct foundation year of USC is 1867, and not 1595, while in 2012 the National Historical Commission of the Philippines cemented its previous position when it published an online article recognizing UST as "Asia's Oldest University.

Secondary schools

A Nautical School was created on January 1, 1820, which offered a four-year course of study (for the profession of pilot of merchant marine) that included subjects such as arithmetic, algebra, geometry, trigonometry, physics, hydrography, meteorology, navigation and pilotage. A School of Commercial Accounting and a School of French and English Languages were established in 1839.

The Don Honorio Ventura College of Arts and Trades (DHVCAT) in Bacolor, Pampanga is said to be the oldest official vocational school in Asia. The vocational school started when an Augustinian friar, Fr. Juan P. Zita, dreamed of helping the young lads of Bacolor. Aided by equally benevolent civic leader Don Felino Gil, the school was officially founded on November 4, 1861, upon the approval of its statutes by Governor-General Lemery as Escuela de Artes y Oficios de Bacolor (School of Arts and Trades of Bacolor) and built it on a lot donated by Suarez sisters of Bacolor. Other important vocational schools established were the Escuela de Contaduría, Academia de Pintura y Dibujo and the seminaries of Manila, Nueva Segovia, Cebú, Jaro and Nueva Cáceres.

The Manila School of Agriculture was created in 1887, although it was unable to open its doors until July 1889. Its mission was to provide theoretical and practical education by agricultural engineers to skilled farmers and overseers, and to promote agricultural development by means of observation, experiment and investigation. It included subjects such as mathematics, physics, chemistry, natural history, agriculture, topography, linear and topography drawing. Agricultural schools and monitoring stations, run by professors who were agricultural engineers, were also established in Isabela, Ilocos, Albay, Cebú, Iloílo, Leyte and parts of Mindanao.

The Real Sociedad Económica de los Amigos del País de Filipinas (Royal Economic Society of Friends of the Philippines) was first introduced in the islands in 1780, and offered local and foreign scholarships to Filipinos, professorships and financed trips of scientists from Spain to the Philippines. Throughout the nineteenth century the society established an academy of design, financed the publication of scientific and technical literature, and granted awards to successful experiments and inventions that improved agriculture and industry.

The Observatorio Meteorológico del Ateneo Municipal de Manila (Manila Observatory) was founded in 1865 by the Jesuits after an article they published in the newspaper Diario de Manila, describing typhoon observations made in September 1865, attracted the attention of many readers who publicly requested for the observations to be continued. The Spanish government made the observatory the official institution for weather forecasting in the Philippines in 1884, and in 1885 it started its time service. Its seismology section was set up in 1887, while astronomical studies began in 1899. The Observatory published typhoon and climatological observations and studies, including the first typhoon warnings, a service that was highly appreciated by the business community, specially those involved in merchant shipping.

Modern public system of education

[[File:01075jfTondo Abad Santos Santa Cruz Manila Roads Landmarksfvf 02.jpg|thumb|Gen. Gregorio del Pilar Elementary School began as Tondo's Escuela de Niños y Niñas established by the Cebuano entrepreneur Don Guillermo Osmeña in 1865. The school was dedicated to the sons and daughters of indios who couldn't afford the private schools within the vicinity of Tondo.<ref>{{cite web |title=The History of Gen. Gregorio del Pilar Elementary School |url=http://gdelpilares.depedmanila.com/history-2/ |archive-url=https://web.archive.org/web/20190814170156/http://gdelpilares.depedmanila.com/history-2/ |archive-date=August 14, 2019 |language=en |quote=This school was ungraded and for sons and daughters of "Indios" who could not afford to enroll in the neighboring private school within the arrabales of Sta Cruz, Tondo, Binondo and Trozo.}}</ref>]]

Modern public school education was introduced in Spain in 1857. This did not exist in any other colony of any European power in Asia. The concept of mass education was relatively new, an offshoot of the 18th century Age of Enlightenment. France was the first country in the world to create a system of mass, public education in 1833.

In the Philippines, free access to modern public education was made possible through the enactment of the Spanish Education Decree of December 20, 1863 by Queen Isabella II. Primary instruction was made free and the teaching of Spanish was compulsory. This was ten years before Japan had a compulsory form of free modern public education and forty years before the American government started an English-based public school system in the Philippines. The royal decree provided for a complete educational system consisting of primary, secondary and tertiary levels, resulting in valuable training for all Filipino children and youth.

The Education Decree of 1863 provided for the establishment of at least two free primary schools, one for boys and another for girls, in each town under the responsibility of the municipal government. It also commended the creation of a free public normal school to train men as teachers, supervised by the Jesuits. One of these schools was the Escuela Normal Elemental, which, in 1896 became the Escuela Normal Superior de Maestros de Manila (The Normal School) for male teachers. The Spanish government also established a school for midwives in 1879, and a Normal School for female teachers in 1892, the Escuela Normal Superior de Maestras. By the 1890s, free public secondary schools were opening outside of Manila, including 10 normal schools for women.

The range of subjects being taught were very advanced, as can be seen from the Syllabus of Education in the Municipal Atheneum of Manila, that included Algebra, Agriculture, Arithmetic, Chemistry, Commerce, English, French, Geography, Geometry, Greek, History, Latin, Mechanics, Natural History, Painting, philosophy, Physics, Rhetoric and poetry, Spanish Classics, Spanish Composition, Topography, and Trigonometry. Among the subjects being taught to girls, as reflected in the curriculum of the Colegio de Santa Isabel'', were Arithmetic, Drawing, Dress-cutting, French, Geology, Geography, Geometry, History of Spain, Music, Needlework, Philippine History, Physics, Reading, Sacred History and Spanish Grammar.

Contrary to what the Propaganda of the Spanish–American War tried to depict, the Spanish public system of education was open to all the natives, regardless of race, gender or financial resources. The Black Legend propagation, black propaganda and yellow journalism were rampant in the last two decades of Spanish Colonial Period and throughout the American Colonial Period. Manuel L. Quezon, on his speech for the Philippine Assembly at the US Congress in October 1914 stated that 

Gunnar Myrdal, a renowned Swedish economist, observed that in 19th-century Asia, Japan and Spanish Philippines stood out because of their stress on modern public education.

Education and Filipino nationalism

As a result of increasing the number of educated Filipinos a new social class raised, which came to be known as the Ilustrados. Furthermore, with the opening of the Suez Canal in 1869 travel to Spain become quicker, easier and more affordable, and many Filipinos took advantage of it to continue higher education in Spain and Europe, mostly in Madrid and Barcelona. This new enlightened class of Filipinos would later lead the Philippine independence movement, using the Spanish language as their main communication method. The most prominent of the Ilustrados was José Rizal, who inspired the desire for independence with his novels written in Spanish. Other Filipino intellectuals, such as Graciano López Jaena, Marcelo H. del Pilar, Mariano Ponce or Antonio Luna, who had also studied in Spain, began contributing to the cause for Filipino self-government and independence.

Describing this new generation of highly educated Filipinos, Fr. John N. Schumacher pointed out that,

The Philippines was also ahead of some European countries in offering education for women. Ironically, it was during the time of American occupation of the Philippines that the results of Spanish education were more visible, especially in the literature, printed press and cinema.

Criticisms

On November 30, 1900, the Philippine Commission reported to the US War Department about the state of education throughout the archipelago as follows:

Those numbers led some people to conclude that less than 6% of the population were attending schools. However that assumption was misleading because it is calculated based on the entire population, including babies and senior citizens, when in reality public school systems are meant primarily for children and teenagers. In order to calculate the percentage of children attending schools, the number of children of school age must be used, including those of elementary school age (ages 5 through 13) and teenagers in High School age (ages 14 through 17). That would yield a total percentage of around 20% of the total population. Since the 1887 census yielded a count of 6,984,727, 20% would be approximately 1,4 million. Also, by 1892 the number of schools had more than doubled to 2,137, 1,087 of which were for boys and 1,050 for girls, which means that the number of children attending school also did increase, to at least 500,000, by conservative estimates. That's about 35% of the population in School age.

Another claim commonly heard was that based on the official figures there couldn't be a school in every village in the Islands, as Manuel L. Quezon declared years later before the Philippine Assembly. However, since those official figures branded by the Philippine Commission itself put the total number of municipalities in the archipelago at 900, and the number of public schools at 2,167, those numbers reveal that there was not only one school in every municipality in the Islands, but in most cases two or more.

Neither was taken into account that the schools maintained by Spain were closed and in many cases looted and badly damaged during the Spanish–American War and the Philippine Revolution. Although the free and compulsory elementary education system was temporarily reestablished by the Malolos Constitution, it was finally dismantled after the Philippine–American War, that also took a heavy toll upon the remaining educational infrastructures.

Finally, the Philippine Commission made no reference to the fact that the pioneering public school education introduced by Spain in the Philippines was the first of its kind in all of Asia, and the first to be established in any European colony in the world. Such system was even ahead of most of United States at the time, where by 1900 only 34 states had any kind of compulsory schooling laws requiring attendance until age 14. As a result, the average American at the time was less educated than the average Filipino, something that was specially true among the troops that fought in the Philippine–American War, since most of the soldiers generally were of humble social origins.

See also

Education in the Philippines
Education in the Philippines during United States rule
Department of Education (Philippines)
Education in Spain
Philippine literature in Spanish
Spanish language in the Philippines
History of the Philippines

Notes

References

Bibliography

Further reading

Private education

 
 

Public education

 

Role of the missionaries in education

 
 
 
 

Miscellaneous

External links
Miguel de Benavides Library
Rizal Library

Life and Works of Fray Juan de Plasencia
Teaching and Health Care during Spanish Rule (in English and Spanish)
'Older than Harvard': Philippine university celebrates 400th anniversary
UST is oldest, period

Education in the Philippines
History of the Philippines by topic